Robert A. Trias (March 18, 1923 – July 11, 1989) was an American karate pioneer, founding the first karate school in the mainland United States and becoming one of the first known American black belts. He also developed Shuri-ryū karate, an eclectic style with roots in Chinese kung-fu, and indirectly some Okinawan karate.

Life before karate 
Trias was employed by Southern Pacific Company as a boilermaker apprentice from 1937 to 1939 and a boilermaker from 1939 to 1942.

Introduction to karate
While serving in the United States Naval Reserve as a Metalsmith First Class (M1c) during World War II, Robert Trias was stationed on or around Tulagi in the Solomon Islands from June 1944 to November 1945, and was a Navy champion middleweight boxer. There he met Tung Gee Hsiang, a Chinese missionary of Chan (Zen) Buddhism. Hsiang often watched Trias work out and imitated his boxing footwork, and he asked to practice with Trias. Trias refused because Hsiang was "just a tiny little guy," but Hsiang was persistent and at last Trias agreed to spar with him. Hsiang gave Trias "the biggest thrashing of his life" and Trias then asked Hsiang to instruct him in the martial arts.

Hsiang taught Trias some xingyiquan as well as some Okinawan Shuri-Te karate, which Hsiang had learned from Choki Motobu in Okinawa. Later, Trias studied with Hoy Yuan Ping whose lineage was from the Teshin Shinjo School of Kempo Jujutsu in Japan. Trias also held a 6th dan black belt in Kodokan Judo, and studied under Yaju Yamada. Trias was also mentored by Yasuhiro Konishi (1893-1983) and Makoto Gima (1896-1989).

Karate in the U.S. 
In late 1945, shortly before Trias left the Navy in January of the following year, he began teaching martial arts in his backyard. He later opened the first public karate school operated by a Caucasian in the United States mainland in Phoenix, Arizona, in 1946. Trias served as an officer of the Arizona State Highway Patrol from 1946 to 1961 utilizing his self-defense knowledge on duty and teaching his fellow officers. In 1948 he founded the United States Karate Association (USKA), the first karate organization on the American mainland.  Jointly with John Keehan, Trias hosted the first national karate tournament in the United States, called the 1st World Karate Tournament, at the University of Chicago Fieldhouse in 1963 in Chicago, IL.  This event was retitled the USKA Nationals in 1966 and the USKA Grand Nationals in 1968. His rules for tournament competition are still used today with only slight variation.

Trias' style was once dubbed, by Trias himself, as Shuri Karate Kenpo, Goju-Shorei-Ryu, and Shorei-Goju ryu though there is no relationship or direct ancestry to the Goju-Ryu currently practiced in Okinawa or the original form of Shorei-ryu once practiced by the Okinawans. His style is now referred to as Shuri-ryu to imply roots to traditional karate though his style is much different from any martial art originating from the Okinawan islands. It has much more Chinese influence and overtones than Okinawan. The naming of his style was as eclectic as the style itself.  A few US organizations claim to trace their roots to him and the USKA, including the United States Karate-Do Kai, Professional Karate Commission, United States Karate Alliance, International Shuri-Ryu Association, and Kondo No Shokai.

Career accomplishments
Robert Trias was responsible for the following developments in karate in United States:
1955 - Wrote the first rules for karate competition.
1955 - Conducted the first karate tournament.
1958 - Wrote the first textbook.
1959 - Made the first instructional film.
1963 - Conducted the first world karate championships.
1968 - Conducted the first professional karate tournament.

Published works
Trias  authored  Karate is my Life (1963), The Hand is my Sword (1974), The Pinnacle of Karate (1980), The Supreme Way (1983), and Render Yourself Empty (1984).

Honors
Trias   was the recipient of the 1989 Black Belt Hall of Fame Honorary Award.

Legacy
Trias formed the United States Karate Association in 1946, it continued after his passing until 1999. An arm of the USKA was the Trias International Society, which honored the outstanding competitors of the USKA in its heyday. The Trias International Society froze all new inductions after Master Trias' passing. Trias International members carried on the tradition by forming extended hall of fames such as USKK Bushido International Society, USKA (alliance) Hall of Fame, Hawkes International Society, Bowles International Society, Rabino Shuri-Te Society, PKC Elite, and the International Warrior Society.

Death
Trias died from a stent of reoccurring illnesses. Including a number of infections and stage 2 cancer complications exaggerated by an unspecified preexisting condition on July 11, 1989, leaving multiple branches of the Shuri ryu system. Most of the highest ranks and Chief Instructors followed Robert Bowles in the formation of the International Shuri-ryu Association

References

External links
 Trias Karate
 Robert A. Trias shuri-ryu.com
 Grandmaster Trias suncoastkarate.com

1923 births
1989 deaths
American boilermakers
American railroaders
Sportspeople from Tucson, Arizona
American male karateka
Martial arts school founders
20th-century philanthropists
United States Navy personnel of World War II